Here and Now is Canadian country music singer Charlie Major's first album released in the United States. The album features songs from Major's first two Canadian releases, The Other Side and Lucky Man.

Track listing
All tracks written by Charlie Major except where noted.
 "Someday I'm Gonna Ride in a Cadillac" - 3:40
 "Waiting on You" - 4:00
 "It Can't Happen to Me" - 3:58
 "This Crazy Heart of Mine" - 4:04
 "(I Do It) For the Money" - 3:23
 "I Can See Forever in Your Eyes" - 3:44
 "Tell Me Something I Don't Know" (Major, Barry Brown) - 4:06
 "Runaway Train" - 3:49
 "It's Lonely I Can't Stand" (Major, Brown) - 3:59
 "Solid as a Rock" (Major, Brown) - 4:57
 "Lucky Man" - 5:15
 "Remember the Alamo" (Jane Bowers) - 4:23

External links
 [ allmusic.com]

Charlie Major albums
1996 compilation albums
Imprint Records compilation albums